A secret identity is a person's alter ego which is not known to the general populace, most often used in fiction.

Secret identity may also refer to:

 Secret Identity, a 2006 novel based on the TV series Lost
 My Secret Identity, a 1980s TV series 
 Superman: Secret Identity, a 2004 TV miniseries
 "Secret Identity", a song by The Jealous Girlfriends from the 2007 album The Jealous Girlfriends
 Secret Identities: The Asian American Superhero Anthology, a comics anthology
 Secret Identity, a CSI: Crime Scene Investigation comic

See also

 Alter ego
 Covert agent
 Front organization
 Incarnation
 Non-official cover
 Official cover
 Pseudonym
 Undercover operation